Namhsan Township is a township of the Pa Laung Self-Administered Zone in the Shan State of eastern Burma (Myanmar). The principal town and administrative seat is Namhsan.

Prior to August 2010, Kyaukme District included Namhsan Township and Mantong Township; and both of them were transferred that month to the newly created Pa Laung Self-Administered Zone.

References

Townships of Shan State